Ilya Aleksandrovich Trunin (born 25 May 1992) is a Russian football goalkeeper. He plays for FC Murom.

Club career
He made his debut in the Russian Second Division for FC Sibir-2 Novosibirsk on 23 April 2011 in a game against FC KUZBASS Kemerovo.

He made his Russian Football National League debut for FC Sibir Novosibirsk on 12 May 2012 in a game against FC Shinnik Yaroslavl.

References

1992 births
Sportspeople from Izhevsk
Living people
Russian footballers
Russia under-21 international footballers
Association football goalkeepers
FC Sibir Novosibirsk players
FC Fakel Voronezh players
FC Neftekhimik Nizhnekamsk players
FC Dynamo Stavropol players